Paragehyra gabriellae is a species of lizard in the family Gekkonidae. The species is endemic to Madagascar.

Etymology
The specific name, gabriellae, is in honor of Malagasy herpetologist Gabriellà Raharimanana.

Geographic range
P. gabriellae is found in southern Madagascar in the vicinity of the cities Tôlanaro and Toliara.

Habitat

Reproduction
P. gabriellae is oviparous.

References

Further reading
Glaw F, Vences M (1994). A Fieldguide to the Amphibians and Reptiles of Madagascar, Second Edition. Cologne, Germany: Vences & Glaw Verlag / Serpents Tale. 480 pp. . (Paragehra gabriellae, p. 277).
Nussbaum RA, Raxworthy CJ (1994). "The genus Paragehyra (Reptilia: Sauria: Gekkonidae) in southern Madagascar". Journal of Zoology 232 (1): 37–59. (Paragehyra gabriellae, new species).
Rösler H (2000). "Kommentierte Liste der rezent, subrezent und fossil bekannten Geckotaxa (Reptilia: Gekkonomorpha)". Gekkota 2: 28–153. (Paragehyra gabriellae, p. 100). (in German).

Paragehyra
Reptiles of Madagascar
Reptiles described in 1994